Herbert Ninaus (31 March 1937 in Voitsberg - 24 April 2015) was an Austrian-Australian international Football player and manager.

Career 
Herbert Ninaus began his career at FC St. Veit, after which he, and later his brother, moved to first division side GAK.
The winger soon debuted in the Austrian league in the 1954/55 season, becoming a regular player. After a strong 1957/58 season, scoring 24 goals in 25 games, Herbert Ninaus was called up for the 1958 World Cup but was not used. He was needed only a short time later, however, making his international debut against Yugoslavia on 5 October 1958 and celebrated the occasion by scoring a goal.

During the winter break in 1958/59, Ninaus decided to emigrate to Australia, where he played at Sydney Prague and was a member of their New South Wales Division One championship winning team in 1959. Later he played for Sydney Hakoah and scored the decisive goal in their 1965 Australia Cup triumph. After becoming an Australian citizen he played two B international games in 1964 for Australia against touring English team Everton F.C., scoring three goals. He also played several times for New South Wales.

After finishing his playing career, Ninaus worked as a trainer for Marrickville and Canterbury.

Achievements 
 New South Wales Division One champions: 1959
 Australia Cup winner: 1965
 2 caps and 1 goal for the Austria national football team, 1958
 2 caps and 3 goals for the Australia National Football team, 1964

See also 
 List of Australia international soccer players born outside Australia

References

External links 
 
 

1937 births
2015 deaths
Australian soccer players
Austrian footballers
Australia international soccer players
Austria international footballers
Grazer AK players
1958 FIFA World Cup players
Austrian emigrants to Australia
Association football forwards
Sydney FC Prague players
People from Voitsberg
Footballers from Styria